Statistics of the 1987–88 Saudi First Division.

External links 
 Saudi Arabia Football Federation
 Saudi League Statistics
 Al Jazirah 10 Jan 1988 issue 5582 

Saudi First Division League seasons
Saudi Professional League
2